The 11th Signal Brigade and Headquarters West Midlands is a signal formation of the British Army's 3rd UK Division. Its headquarters is located at Venning Barracks, in Donnington in Shropshire.

History
The brigade was formed as 11th Signal Group in Liverpool in 1967. It became 11th Signal Brigade in 1982 and was redesignated 11th (ARRC) Signal Brigade in 1992 and  reverted to 11th Signal Brigade in 1997. In November 2014, in accordance with the Army 2020 reorganisation, 11th Signal Brigade amalgamated with 143 (West Midlands) Brigade to create a new formation, based at Venning Barracks in Donnington, named 11th Signal Brigade and Headquarters West Midlands, with an additional role as a regional brigade for army regular and reserve units in the West Midlands counties. A formation parade took place at Donnington on 15 November 2014.

Role
One of the brigade's responsibilities is to provide administrative support for around 8,000 Army personnel who are based in the region, as well as forming a vital link between the Army and its local communities. The Brigade has five Regular Army signal regiments and five Army Reserve  Signal regiments. Under Army 2020, it is the Regional Point of Command for the West Midlands. In addition, it has command responsibilities for the Army Cadet Forces and some of the Army Reserve units in the region.

Structure

11th Signal Brigade 
The current operational structure of the brigade, which is based at Venning Barracks, Donnington (to move to Beacon Barracks, Stafford), is:

 10th Signal Regiment, Royal Corps of Signals, at Basil Hill Barracks, Corsham
 81 Signal Squadron, in Corsham (Army Reserve)
 32nd (Scottish) Signal Regiment, Royal Corps of Signals, HQ in Glasgow (Army Reserve – Apps/Data support, paired with 16 Signal Regiment in 1 (UK) Signal Brigade)
 39th (Skinners) Signal Regiment, Royal Corps of Signals, HQ in Bristol (Army Reserve – Apps/Data support, paired with 22 Signal Regiment in 1 (UK) Signal Brigade)
7 Signal Group, at Venning Barracks, Donnington (to move to Kiwi Barracks, Bulford)
 1st Signal Regiment, Royal Corps of Signals, at Beacon Barracks, Stafford (to move to Swinton Barracks, Perham Down to support 20th Armoured Infantry Brigade)
 15th Signal Regiment, Royal Corps of Signals, at Blandford Camp (to move to Swinton Barracks, Perham Down to support 12th Armoured Infantry Brigade)
 21st Signal Regiment, Royal Corps of Signals, at Azimghur Barracks, Colerne (to move to Catterick Garrison in 2020/21 to provide support to the Strike Brigade)
 71st (City of London) Yeomanry Signal Regiment, Royal Corps of Signals, HQ in Bexleyheath (Army Reserve – Paired with 3 Signal Regiment under 3 (UK) Division)

Headquarters West Midlands 
This regional command now administers all units in the following counties; Shropshire, Herefordshire, Worcestershire, Warwickshire, Staffordshire, and West Midlands County.  The following groups fall under administrative command of the group:
 Headquarters West Midlands, at Venning Barracks, Donnington
 Birmingham University Officers' Training Corps (Army Reserve), at Montgomery House, Birmingham
 11th Signal Brigade & Headquarters West Midlands Cadet Training Team, in Dawley Bank, Telford
 Derbyshire Army Cadet Force, in Derby
 Herefordshire and Worcestershire Army Cadet Force, at Sulva Barracks, Hereford
 Shropshire Army Cadet Force, at Copthorne Barracks, Shrewsbury
 Staffordshire and West Midlands (North Sector) Army Cadet Force, at Beacon Barracks, Stafford
 Warwickshire and West Midlands (South Sector) Army Cadet Force, in Harborne

See also

 Units of the Royal Corps of Signals

References

External links
11th Signal Brigade and Headquarters West Midlands

Signal brigades of the British Army
British Army Regional Points of Command
Military units and formations established in 2014